Full Service Network is a Western Pennsylvania facility based Competitive Local Exchange Carrier (CLEC) providing services which include High Speed Internet and Broadband Phone Service.  It was founded in 1989 by University of Pittsburgh student David E. Schwencke.

Company History
Founded in 1989 as a software company, Full Service Network soon entered the telecommunications landscape in the early 1990s.  
Throughout the decade as land line phone services became competitive, FSN focused mostly on serving the commercial market of small to mid-size businesses.  In 1998, FSN entered the residential market and had over 10,000 residential subscribers in Western PA and thousands more across Pennsylvania.  They no longer provide residential phone and internet to new customers.

Since its beginning, FSN has steadily grown and now employs around 85 people in the US Steel Tower in downtown Pittsburgh.  In 2012, Full Service Network was recognized by the Pittsburgh Post-Gazette as one of Pittsburgh's Top Work Places.  And in 2013, the Pittsburgh Business Times awarded FSN with a "Best Places to Work in Western Pennsylvania" honor.  As of 2016, Full Service Network has been recognized by the Pittsburgh Post-Gazette as one of Pittsburgh's Top Work Places for 3 years in a row.

Other Full Service Networks

Time Warner TV Venture in Florida 1994 to 1997
Not related to the current day Full Service Network in Pittsburgh, formerly the Full Service Network, also known as FSN was an 18-month trial interactive television service launched by Time Warner Inc. in Orlando, Florida. The FSN was active between 1994 and 1997 targeting an initial number of 4,000 households with services that ranged from video-on-demand to ordering fast food using just the TV remote. At its time, it was dubbed the "most futuristic network introduced so far."

The trial aimed to study how interactive services would work, as well as their costs and advertising capabilities. It also aimed to find out "what people will want when the equipment that is now so expensive becomes affordable several years down the road."

The World's First Interactive TV Network
Time Warner's Full Service Network was described as "the first in the world to integrate emerging cable, computer, and telephone technologies over a fiber-optic and coaxial cable network." This meant that the service offered traditional cable, interactive television, telephone services, and high-speed PC access to on-line services.

Regardless of its first-time advantages, the FSN was not television's first attempt at interactivity, nor was it Time Warner Cable's first attempt. Previous efforts included 1977's QUBE, a service offered by Warner-Amex (a joint venture between Warner Cable and American Express) initially in Columbus, OH, then expanding into cities such as Dallas, and Pittsburgh; as well as the 1950s children television show Winky Dink and You, which prompted interactivity through the use of plastics 'Magic Screens' that parents would place on the actual television display so kids could draw on them.

However, the FSN's service was very similar to 2008 interactive services. Users would be plugged into the network using set top boxes and selecting the offerings of their choice using just the remote control. The drawback: the cost of set top-boxes was extremely high in the 1990s (over $1000.)

According to Gerald M. Levine, chairman and CEO of Time Warner at the time, the FSN was part of the company's strategy for driving the growth of its copyright businesses:

Start-up and Services
The FSN's first households were plugged-in in December 1994 in Orlando, Florida.

According to the Hong Kong University of Science and Technology the city of Orlando was chosen because of its worry-free weather, the fact that it was Time Warner Cable's second largest division and because it already featured fiber-optic network installations (which would reduce implementation costs.) The city's high growth demographics, with large percentages of households with children, complemented the decision.

The specific test area was suburban Orlando, including southwest Seminole County and parts of Orange County (Wekiva, Sweetwater, Lake Brantley, and Spring Lake Hills).

Available interactive services were added to the network bit by bit. They included on-demand games, sports and movies, food ordering, and also local information, events and shopping opportunities through GOtv, an interactive entertainment guide.

GOtv worked in association with other media, such as The Orlando Sentinel, in compiling reviews and other information on restaurants, their menus, prices, location and hours.

In 1996, the services of FSN were made available for the general public to check out at Walt Disney World's Epcot Center Innoventions expo, where "Five stations are available for guests to interact with the television through the network's Carousel(tm) navigator."

Michael Colglazier, General Manager of Innoventions, qualified the technology as life changing, and was very pleased to offer the Disney's guests a chance to experience it.

TV Printers and Pizza
Hewlett-Packard was one of the early partners of the FSN, which was also the only trial to offer full-page, color printing for interactive television.

HP participated "to learn about the printing and order fulfillment needs of interactive-TV users, service providers and advertisers".

The service aimed to offer users the possibility to print out the information available in the FSN's interactive guides, as well as the map locations for shops and restaurants, or ticket events.

As for pizza, Pizza Hut was the FSN partner. The service offered users the chance to order pizza, drinks and other products from the chain's menu using their remote.

This, according to Pizza Hut's spokesperson, Chris Romoser, represented an advantage for everyone involved: users had to press fewer buttons on their remote control than they would have to dialing for delivery, and less restaurant-employee time will be required for the completion of the ordering process.

According to Tom Feige, president of the FSN:

Pizza Hut is a great example of how FSN customers not only watch television, they use television as well. The future of television lies in its potential to give users greater choice, convenience and control of their viewing habits and consumer activities.

Time Warner FSN's Ending
The Orlando Business Journal announced in 1997 the closing of the Full Service Network. The article listed as the reason Time Warner's shifting emphasis toward an evolved form of the technology being developed by outside companies under contract with Time Warner Cable.

The company had 156 employees at the time at its main office in Maitland.

References

External links

Interactive television
Telecommunications companies of the United States
Companies based in Pittsburgh
American companies established in 1989
1989 establishments in Pennsylvania